Lu Shan (born 25 July 1989) also known as Amber Lu, is a Chinese actress and model.

Filmography

Film

Television series

References

External links 
 

1989 births
Living people
21st-century Chinese actresses
Chinese film actresses
Chinese television actresses
Chinese female models
People from Zibo
Actresses from Shandong
Beijing Film Academy alumni